Population ethics is the philosophical study of the ethical problems arising when our actions affect who is born and how many people are born in the future. An important area within population ethics is population axiology, which is "the study of the conditions under which one state of affairs is better than another, when the states of affairs in question may differ over the numbers and the identities of the persons who ever live."

Moral philosopher Derek Parfit brought population ethics to the attention of the academic community as a modern branch of moral philosophy in his seminal work Reasons and Persons in 1984. Discussions of population ethics are thus a relatively recent development in the history of philosophy. Formulating a satisfactory theory of population ethics is regarded as "notoriously difficult". While scholars have proposed and debated many different population ethical theories, no consensus in the academic community has emerged.

Gustaf Arrhenius, Professor of Philosophy and Director of the Institute for Futures Studies, comments on the history and challenges within population ethics that

Positions 
All major theories in population ethics tend to produce counterintuitive results. Hilary Greaves, Oxford Professor of Philosophy and director of the Global Priorities Institute, explains that this is no coincidence, as academics have proved a series of impossibility theorems for the field in recent decades. These impossibility theorems are formal results showing that "for various lists of prima facie intuitively compelling desiderata, ... no axiology can simultaneously satisfy all the desiderata on the list." She concludes that choosing a theory in population ethics comes down to choosing which moral intuition one is least unwilling to give up.

Totalism 

Total utilitarianism, or totalism, aims to maximize the total sum of wellbeing in the world, as constituted by the number of individuals multiplied by their average quality of life. Consequently, totalists hold that a state of affairs can be improved either by increasing the average wellbeing level of the existing population or by increasing the population size through the addition of individuals with positive wellbeing. Greaves formally defines totalism as follows: A state of affairs "A is better than B iff total well-being in A is higher than total well-being in B. A and B are equally good iff total well-being in A is equal to total well-being in B."

Totalism mathematically leads to an implication, which many people find counterintuitive. In his Reasons and Persons, Derek Parfit was among the first to spell out and popularize this implication in the academic literature, coining it the "repugnant conclusion".

The repugnant conclusion 

In Parfit's original formulation, the repugnant conclusion states that 

Parfit arrives at this conclusion by showing that there is a series of steps, each of which intuitively makes the overall state of the world better, that leads from an "A" world—one with a large population with high average wellbeing—to a "Z" world—one with an extremely large population but just barely positive average wellbeing. Totalism leads to the repugnant conclusion because it holds that the Z world is better than the A world, as the total wellbeing is higher in the Z world for a sufficiently large population.

Greaves writes that Parfit searched for a way to avoid the repugnant conclusion, but that he

The impossibility theorems in population ethics highlight the difficulty of avoiding the repugnant conclusion without giving up even more fundamental axioms in ethics and rationality. In light of this, several prominent academics have come to accept and even defend the repugnant conclusion, including philosophers Torbjörn Tannsjö and Michael Huemer, because this strategy avoids all the impossibility theorems.

Averagism 

Average utilitarianism, or averagism, aims only to improve the average wellbeing level, without regard for the number of individuals in existence. Averagism avoids the repugnant conclusion, because it holds that, in contrast to totalism, reductions in the average wellbeing level can never be compensated for by adding more people to the population. Greaves defines averagism formally as follows: A state of affairs "A is better than B iff average well-being in A is higher than average well-being in B. A and B are equally good iff average well-being in A is equal to average well-being in B."

Averagism has never been widely embraced by philosophers, because it leads to counterintuitive implications said to be "at least as serious" as the repugnant conclusion. In particular, Parfit shows that averagism leads to the conclusion that a population of just one person is better than any large population—say, the 7.7 billion people alive today—as long as the average wellbeing level of the single person is slightly higher than of the large group of people. More counterintuitively still, averagism also implies that "for a population consisting of just one person leading a life at a very negative level of well-being, e.g., a life of constant torture, there is another population which is better even though it contains millions of lives at just a slightly less negative level of well-being".

Sadistic conclusion 
Averagism entails a further counterintuitive implication, called the "sadistic conclusion". Arrhenius defines it as follows: "An addition of lives with negative welfare can be better than an addition of lives with positive welfare." This follows from averagism since adding a small number of tortured people with horrible lives to a population diminishes the average wellbeing level by less, than would creating a sufficiently large number of people with positive lives, as long as their wellbeing is below average.

Person-affecting views 

Some people have the intuition that, all else being equal, adding a happy person to the population does not constitute an improvement to the overall state of the world. This intuition is captured by the person-affecting class of views in population ethics, and is often expressed in Jan Narveson's words that "we are in favour of making people happy, but neutral about making happy people".

Person-affecting views can be seen as a revision of total utilitarianism in which the "scope of the aggregation" is changed from all individuals who would exist to a subset of those individuals (though the details of this vary). They avoid the repugnant conclusion, because they deny that a loss of wellbeing in the present generation can be compensated by bringing additional people into existence that would enjoy a high wellbeing.

Person-affecting views can be characterized by the following two claims: first, the person-affecting restriction holds that doing something morally good or bad requires it to be good or bad for someone; and second, the incomparability of non-existence holds that existing and non-existing are incomparable, which implies that it cannot be good or bad for someone to come into existence. Taken together, these claims entail what Greaves describes as the neutrality principle: "Adding an extra person to the world, if it is done in such away as to leave the well-being levels of others unaffected, does not make a state of affairs either better or worse."

However, person-affecting views generate many counterintuitive implications, leading Greaves to comment that "it turns out to be remarkably difficult to formulate any remotely acceptable axiology that captures this idea of neutrality".

Asymmetric views towards suffering and happiness 
One of the most challenging problems population ethics faces, affecting in particular person-affecting views is that of the asymmetry between bringing into existence happy and unhappy (not worth living) lives. Jeff McMahan describes the asymmetry by saying that

One response to this challenge has been to reject this asymmetry and claim that just as we have reasons not to bring into existence a being who will have a bad life, we have reasons to bring into existence a being who will have a good life. Critics of this view can claim either that our reasons not to bring into existence unhappy lives are stronger than our reasons to create happy lives, or that while we should avoid creating unhappy lives we have no reason to create happy lives. While this claim has been defended from different view points, it is the one that would be favored especially by negative consequentialism and other suffering-focused views.

Practical relevance 
Population ethical problems are particularly likely to arise when making large-scale policy-decisions, but they can also affect how we should evaluate certain choices made by individuals. Examples of practical questions that give rise to population ethical problems include the decision whether or not to have an additional child; how to allocate life-saving resources between young and old people; how many resources to dedicate to climate change mitigation; and whether or not to support family planning programs in the developing world. The decisions made about all of these cases affect the number, the identity and the average quality of life of future people.

One's views regarding population ethics have the potential to significantly shape what one thinks of as the most pressing moral priorities. For instance, the total view in population ethics and related theories, have been claimed to imply longtermism, defined by the Global Priorities Institute at the University of Oxford as "the view that the primary determinant of the differences in value of the actions we take today is the effect of those actions on the very long-term future". On this basis, Oxford philosopher Nick Bostrom argues that the prevention of existential risks to humanity is an important global priority in order to preserve the value of the many lives that could come to exist in the future. Others who have endorsed the asymmetry between bringing into existence happy and miserable lives have also supported a longtermist approach and focused on the prevention of risks of scenarios of future suffering, especially those where suffering would prevail over happiness or where there might be astronomical amounts of suffering. Longtermist ideas have been taken up and are put into practice by several organizations associated with the effective altruism community, such as the Open Philanthropy Project and 80,000 Hours, as well as by philanthropists like Dustin Moskovitz

See also
Average and total utilitarianism
Mere addition paradox (also called the repugnant conclusion)
Person-affecting view
The Asymmetry (population ethics)

References

Further reading 

 Hurka, Thomas (1983). "Value and population size". Ethics, 93(3), pp. 496 – 507.
 Parfit, Derek (1984). Reasons and Persons. Oxford University Press.
 Parfit, Derek (1997). "Equality and priority". Ratio, 10, pp. 202–222. 
 Carlson, Erik (1998). "Mere addition and two trilemmas of population ethics". Economics and Philosophy, 14 , pp. 283–306.
 Arrhenius, Gustaf (2000). Future generations: A challenge for moral theory. Doctoral thesis at the University of Uppsala. 
 Beckstead, Nick (2013). "On the overwhelming importance of shaping the far future", Doctoral thesis at Rutgers University.
Parfit, Derek (2016). "Can we avoid the repugnant conclusion?", Theoria, 82 (2), pp. 110–127.
 Greaves, Hilary (2017). "Population axiology". Philosophy Compass, 12(11). 
 Teruji, Thomas (2017). "Some possibilities in population axiology". Mind, 127(507), pp. 807–832.

External links

Populationethics.org includes a list of essential academic readings on population ethics
The Repugnant Conclusion in the Stanford Encyclopedia of Philosophy
 Population Ethics in MacAskill, William and Chappell, Richard Yetter (2021). Introduction to Utilitarianism: An Online Textbook.

 
Human overpopulation
Environmental controversies